The spinothalamic tract  is a part of the anterolateral system or the ventrolateral system, a sensory pathway to the thalamus. From the ventral posterolateral nucleus in the thalamus, sensory information is relayed upward to the somatosensory cortex of the postcentral gyrus.

The spinothalamic tract consists of two adjacent pathways: anterior and lateral. The anterior spinothalamic tract carries information about crude touch. The lateral spinothalamic tract conveys pain and temperature.

In the spinal cord, the spinothalamic tract has somatotopic organization. This is the segmental organization of its cervical, thoracic, lumbar, and sacral components, which is arranged from most medial to most lateral respectively.

The pathway crosses over (decussates) at the level of the spinal cord, rather than in the brainstem like the dorsal column-medial lemniscus pathway and lateral corticospinal tract. It is one of the three tracts which make up the anterolateral system.

Structure
 
There are two main parts of the spinothalamic tract: 
 The lateral spinothalamic tract transmits pain and temperature.
 The anterior spinothalamic tract (or ventral spinothalamic tract) transmits crude touch and firm pressure.

The spinothalamic tract, like the dorsal column-medial lemniscus pathway, uses three neurons to convey sensory information from the periphery to conscious level at the cerebral cortex.

Pseudounipolar neurons in the dorsal root ganglion have axons that lead from the skin into the dorsal spinal cord where they ascend or descend one or two vertebral levels via Lissauer's tract and then synapse with secondary neurons in either the substantia gelatinosa of Rolando or the nucleus proprius. These secondary neurons are called tract cells.

The axons of the tract cells cross over (decussate) to the other side of the spinal cord via the anterior white commissure, and to the anterolateral corner of the spinal cord (hence the spinothalamic tract being part of the anterolateral system). Decussation usually occurs 1-2 spinal nerve segments above the point of entry. The axons travel up the length of the spinal cord into the brainstem, specifically the rostral ventromedial medulla.

Traveling up the brainstem, the tract moves dorsally. The neurons ultimately synapse with third-order neurons in several nuclei of the thalamus—including the medial dorsal, ventral posterior lateral, and ventral posterior medial  nuclei. From there, signals go to the cingulate cortex, the primary somatosensory cortex, and insular cortex respectively.

Anterior spinothalamic tract
The  anterior spinothalamic tract, (Latin: tractus spinothalamicus anterior) or ventral spinothalamic fasciculus situated in the marginal part of the anterior funiculus and intermingled more or less with the vestibulospinal tract, is derived from cells in the posterior column or intermediate gray matter of the opposite side.  Aβ fibres carry sensory information pertaining to crude touch from the skin. After entering the spinal cord the first order neurons synapse (in the nucleus proprius), and the second order neurons decussate via the anterior white commissure. These second order neurons ascend synapsing in the VPL of the thalamus. Incoming first order neurons can ascend or descend via the Lissauer tract. 

This is a somewhat doubtful fasciculus and its fibers are supposed to end in the thalamus and to conduct certain of the touch impulses. More specifically, its fibers convey crude touch information to the VPL (ventral posterolateral nucleus) part of the thalamus.

The fibers of the anterior spinothalamic tract conduct information about pressure and crude touch (protopathic). The fine touch (epicritic) is conducted by fibers of the medial lemniscus. The medial lemniscus is formed by the axons of the neurons of the gracilis and cuneatus nuclei of the medulla oblongata which receive information about light touch, vibration and conscient proprioception from the gracilis and cuneatus fasciculus of the spinal cord. This fasciculus receive the axons of the first order neuron which is located in the dorsal root ganglion that receives afferent fibers from receptors in the skin, muscles and joints.

Lateral spinothalamic tract
The lateral spinothalamic tract (or lateral spinothalamic fasciculus), is a bundle of afferent nerve fibers ascending through the white matter of the spinal cord, in the spinothalamic tract, carrying sensory information to the brain. It carries pain, and temperature sensory information (protopathic sensation) to the thalamus. It is composed primarily of fast-conducting, sparsely myelinated A delta fibers and slow-conducting, unmyelinated C fibers. These are secondary sensory neurons which have already synapsed with the primary sensory neurons of the peripheral nervous system in the posterior horn of the spinal cord (one of the three grey columns).

Together with the anterior spinothalamic tract, the lateral spinothalamic tract is sometimes termed the secondary sensory fasciculus or spinal lemniscus.

Anatomy
The neurons of the lateral spinothalamic tract originate in the spinal dorsal root ganglia.  They project peripheral processes to the tissues in the form of free nerve endings which are sensitive to molecules indicative of cell damage.  The central processes enter the spinal cord in an area at the back of the posterior horn known as the posterolateral tract.  Here, the processes ascend approximately two levels before synapsing on second-order neurons.  These secondary neurons are situated in the posterior horn, specifically in the Rexed laminae regions I, IV, V and VI.  Region II is primarily composed of Golgi II interneurons, which are primarily for the modulation of pain, and largely project to secondary neurons in regions I and V.  Secondary neurons from regions I and V decussate across the anterior white commissure and ascend in the (now contralateral) lateral spinothalamic tract. These fibers will ascend through the brainstem, including the medulla oblongata, pons and midbrain, as the spinal lemniscus until synapsing in the ventroposteriorlateral (VPL) nucleus of the thalamus.  The third order neurons in the thalamus will then project through the internal capsule and corona radiata to various regions of the cortex, primarily the main somatosensory cortex, Brodmann areas 3, 1, and 2.

Function
The types of sensory information means that the sensation is accompanied by a compulsion to act. For instance, an itch is accompanied by a need to scratch, and a painful stimulus makes us want to withdraw from the pain.

There are two sub-systems identified: 
 Direct (for direct conscious appreciation of pain) 
 Indirect (for affective and arousal impact of pain). Indirect projections include 
 Spino-Reticulo-Thalamo-Cortical (part of the ascending reticular arousal system, aka ARAS) 
 Spino-Mesencephalic-Limbic (for affective impact of pain).

Anterolateral system
In the nervous system, the anterolateral system is an ascending pathway that conveys pain, temperature (protopathic sensation), and crude touch from the periphery to the brain. It comprises three main pathways:

Clinical significance
In contrast to the axons of second-order neurons in dorsal column-medial lemniscus pathway, the axons of second-order neurons in the spinothalamic tracts cross at every segmental level in the spinal cord. This fact aids in determining whether a lesion is in the brain or the spinal cord. With lesions in the brain stem or higher, deficits of pain perception, touch sensation, and proprioception are all contralateral to the lesion. With spinal cord lesions, however, the deficit in pain perception is contralateral to the lesion, whereas the other deficits are ipsilateral. See Brown-Séquard syndrome.

Unilateral lesions usually cause contralateral anaesthesia (loss of pain and temperature).  Anaesthesia will normally begin 1-2 segments below the level of lesion, due to the sensory fibers being carried by dorsal-lateral tract of Lissauer up several levels upon entry into the spinal cord, and will affect all caudal body areas.  This is clinically tested by using pin pricks.

See also

 Rostral ventromedial medulla
 Periaqueductal gray
 Neothalamus

References

External links
 
 Diagram at mfi.ku.dk
 Overview at uwm.edu

Spinal cord tracts
Sensory systems
Thalamic connections